Joshua James Gillies (born 12 June 1990) is an English footballer who plays as a winger for Blyth Spartans. Gillies played in the Football League for Carlisle United.

Career
Gillies began his career with non-league Sunderland Nissan and Newcastle Blue Star. In 2009, he moved to Blyth Spartans under Mick Tait, but failed to hold down a first-team place and was allowed to join Whitley Bay in March 2010. At Whitley Bay Gilles scored in the final of the FA Vase as they beat Wroxham 6–1 at Wembley Stadium.

Gateshead
Gilles joined Conference Premier side Gateshead in June 2010. He top-scored for Gateshead in 2012–13 and established himself as one of the best players in non-league football, and was rewarded with a call up to the England C team.

Carlisle United
He signed for Carlisle United in June 2013. He made his Football League debut in a 5–1 defeat against Leyton Orient on 3 August 2013. On 28 November 2013, Gillies joined Cambridge United on loan until January. He made his debut for Cambridge two days later in a 1–0 victory over Salisbury City in the FA Trophy. He scored his first goal for Cambridge on 10 December 2013 in a 3–0 victory over Macclesfield Town. After the expiration of his loan, Gillies rejoined Cambridge on 24 January 2014 on loan for the remainder of the season.

Gillies left Carlisle on 4 May 2015, following the expiry of his contract.

Later career
On 12 June 2015, Gillies re-signed for Conference Premier side Gateshead on a permanent deal. After a year, he signed for Darlington of the National League North, where he was a regular in the team for two seasons. In 2018, he moved on to South Shields of the Northern Premier League.

In July 2021 he returned to Blyth Spartans.

International career
Gillies was selected and called up to the England C team in 2012. He made his international debut on 12 September against Belgium, and also featured against Turkey on 5 February 2013.

Career statistics

A.  The "League" column constitutes appearances and goals (including those as a substitute) in The Football League, Football Conference and Northern League.
B.  The "Other" column constitutes appearances and goals (including those as a substitute) in the Football League Trophy, FA Trophy, FA Vase, Northumberland Senior Cup and Northern League Cup.

Honours
Cambridge United

FA Trophy: 2013–14

References

External links

1990 births
Living people
English footballers
England semi-pro international footballers
Association football midfielders
Sunderland Nissan F.C. players
Newcastle Blue Star F.C. players
Blyth Spartans A.F.C. players
Whitley Bay F.C. players
Gateshead F.C. players
Carlisle United F.C. players
Cambridge United F.C. players
FC Halifax Town players
Darlington F.C. players
South Shields F.C. (1974) players
Northern Football League players
Northern Premier League players
National League (English football) players
English Football League players